Tourbet Aziza Othmana is a Tunisian mausoleum located in the medina of Tunis, at a place called Halqat Al-Naâl1, at the end of the Ech Chamaiya impasse. It's not far from the Ech Chamaiya medresa.

History 

The mausoleum is built by Hussein I, the first Husseinite bey, whose wife is a descendant of Princess Aziza Othmana.

On January 25, 1922, it is classified as a monument.

References 

Mausoleums in Tunisia